is a Russian Japanese racing driver who currently competes in Super Formula Lights and Super GT.

Career
Kimura started professional racing in 2016, competed in Asian Le Mans Sprint Cup. Then in 2017, Kimura raced in Asian Formula Renault Series Class B with PS Racing, however for one round only. He raced again in 2019 to compete in F4 Japanese Championship, where he finished 9th overall.
In 2020, Kimura was supposed to race again in Japanese F4 with new team Honda Formula Dream Project (HFDP), but due to the Covid-19 pandemic, the team has withdrawn from series that year. After one year off racing, Kimura returned to compete in 2021 F4 Japanese Championship with HFDP. In that season, he managed to clinch 3rd place, losing out to the champion Seita Nonaka & Rin Arakawa. His best season up to date with 4 wins to his name.
In 2022, Kimura was promoted to Super Formula Lights, and will also compete in Super GT GT-300 Class with B-Max Racing & ARTA respectively.

Racing Record

Career summary

Complete F4 Japanese Championship results
(key) (Races in bold indicate pole position; races in italics indicate points for the fastest lap of top ten finishers)

Complete Super Formula Lights results 
(key) (Races in bold indicate pole position) (Races in italics indicate fastest lap)

References

External links
 
 http://www.iori-kimura.com | Personal Website

1999 births
Living people
Japanese racing drivers
Super GT drivers
Asian Formula Renault Challenge drivers
Japanese people of Russian descent
Team Aguri drivers
Japanese F4 Championship drivers
B-Max Racing drivers